Jiangnan, formerly romanized as Kiangnan, was a historical province of the early Qing Empire. Its capital was Jiangning (now Nanjing), from which it is sometimes known as Nanjing or Nanking Province. Established in 1645 during the Manchu conquest of Ming China, it administered the area of the earlier Ming province of Nanzhili, reaching from north of the Huai Riverat the time the course of the Yellow Riverto south of the Yangtze River in East China. Its territory was later divided into the separate provinces of Jiangsu and Anhui during the reign of the Qianlong Emperor (1736–1795), although the exact timing is disputed. (The earliest it could have happened was 1667.) Under the Republic and People's Republic of China, an area of Jiangsu also became the provincial-level municipality of Shanghai.

Administrative divisions 
According to the "General History of Jiangnan" (Jiangnan Tongzhi) in the Siku Quanshu, Jiangnan Province consisted of 16 full prefectures (fu) and 8 independent subprefectures or autonomous counties (zhou). After 1661, its provincial governor was assisted by lieutenant governors who each oversaw half of the prefectures. The "Right" administration was based in Suzhou and oversaw Suzhou, Songjiang, Changzhou, Zhenjiang, and Ningguo Prefectures. The "Left" administration was based in Jiangning (now Nanjing) and oversaw the rest. After a series of changes, this division eventually became the basis for the separate provinces of Jiangsu and Anhui at some point under the Qianlong Emperor.

Each of these were further divided into counties (xian), some of which were attached to the prefectural seats. Lower levels were not centrally appointed by the imperial government, but were overseen by the county, prefectural, and provincial administration.

See also 
 Jiangnan, a geographic concept related to the south of the lower reaches of the Yangtze River
 Yang Province, a zhou during Han dynasty, considers one of the Nine Provinces 
 Jiangzhe Province, similar region during the Yuan dynasty 
 Shanghai, Jiangsu and Anhui, the modern successors of Jiangnan Province.

Notes

References 

Administrative divisions of the Qing dynasty
History of Jiangsu
History of Anhui
History of Shanghai